Giuseppe Beviacqua (28 October 1914 in Savona – 19 August 1999 in Savona) was a former Italian long distance runner.

Biography
Giuseppe Beviacqua participated at one edition of the Summer Olympics (1936), he has 22 caps in national team from 1936 to 1951.

Achievements

National titles
Giuseppe Beviacqua has won 15 times the individual national championship.
6 wins in 5000 metres (1938, 1939, 1940, 1941, 1942, 1943)
7 wins in 10000 metres (1936, 1937, 1942, 1943, 1946, 1947, 1948)
2 wins in Cross country running (1949, 1950)

See also
 Italian Athletics Championships - Multi winners
 5000 metres winners of Italian Athletics Championships
 10000 metres winners of Italian Athletics Championships

References

External links
 

1914 births
1999 deaths
Italian male cross country runners
Italian male long-distance runners
Athletes (track and field) at the 1936 Summer Olympics
Olympic athletes of Italy
European Athletics Championships medalists
Italian Athletics Championships winners